Tumamoca is a plant genus in the family Cucurbitaceae. It is named for Tumamoc Hill just west of the City of Tucson, Arizona, where the University of Arizona maintains an ecological research station. The type specimen of T. macdougalii was collected near the station.

The genus Tumamoca has two species currently recognized:

Tumamoca macdougalii, from Arizona and Sonora.

and

Tumamoca mucronata, from Zacatecas.

References

Cucurbitaceae genera
Flora of Arizona
Flora of Sonora
Flora of Zacatecas
Cucurbitoideae